Louis Convers Cramton (December 2, 1875 – June 23, 1966) was a politician and jurist from the U.S. state of Michigan.

Cramton was born in Hadley Township, Michigan and attended the common schools of Lapeer County. He graduated from Lapeer High School in 1893 and from the law department of the University of Michigan at Ann Arbor in 1899. He was admitted to the bar in 1899 and commenced practice in Lapeer. He discontinued the practice of his profession in 1905 and published the Lapeer County Clarion, 1905-1923. He was law clerk of the Michigan Senate for three terms and deputy commissioner of railroads of Michigan in 1907. He was secretary of the Michigan Railroad Commission from September 1907 to January 1, 1909 and a member of the Michigan House of Representatives in 1909 and 1910.

In 1912, Cramton was elected as a Republican to the United States House of Representatives from Michigan's 7th congressional district. He served in the 63rd Congress and the eight succeeding Congresses, from March 4, 1913 to March 3, 1931. In 1930 and 1932, Cramton lost to Jesse P. Wolcott in the Republican primary.

He was special assistant to the U.S. Secretary of the Interior in 1931 and 1932. He led studies of the area around the Colorado River that led to the establishment of the first National Recreation Area, Lake Mead National Recreation Area.

In 1934, he was elected circuit judge of the 40th state judicial circuit, serving from November 21, 1934 to December 31, 1941. He lost his bid for re-election in November 1941. He was a delegate to the 1940 Republican National Convention. He resumed the practice of law and in 1948 was re-elected to the Michigan House of Representatives, serving 1948-1960.

Cramton died in Saginaw, Michigan and is interred in Mt. Hope Cemetery, Lapeer, Michigan.

Cramton's son, Louis K. Cramton, served in the U.S. Army during World War II and was a member of Michigan House of Representatives from Midland County, 1971-80.

Interests and accomplishments
Yellowstone National Park
Yellowstone Park History
Yellowstone Park History

Howard University
A History of the Federal Appropriation of Howard University 1867-1926
Self Guided Tour

References

The Political Graveyard

1875 births
1966 deaths
Republican Party members of the Michigan House of Representatives
Michigan state court judges
University of Michigan Law School alumni
Republican Party members of the United States House of Representatives from Michigan
People from Lapeer County, Michigan
People from Lapeer, Michigan